The Hwang River is a tributary of the Nakdong River, flowing through Gyeongsangnam-do in southeastern South Korea.  It originates in Geochang, from the union of various streams flowing from the slopes of Deogyusan, and meets the Nakdong in Hapcheon County.  It covers about 117 kilometers.  The name literally means "yellow," and refers to the yellow sand found along much of the river's course.

Thanks to its relatively unpolluted waters and abundant fish, the Hwang is home to a population of endangered European otters. It has great fishes.

See also
List of rivers
Hwang Ho

Rivers of South Korea
Rivers of South Gyeongsang Province